A list of films produced by the Marathi language film industry based in Maharashtra in the year 2002.

2002 Releases
A list of Marathi films released in 2002.

References

Lists of 2002 films by country or language
 Marathi
2002